Łukasz Paulewicz (born 3 April 1983) is a former professional footballer who played as a midfielder.

Career

Paulewicz started playing football with the youth sides of MOSiR Pruszcz Gdański before joining Lechia Gdańsk, who had just left the Lechia-Polonia Gdańsk merger and were having to restart from the sixth tier. Paulewicz made his Lechia debut on 18 August 2001 against Delta Miłoradz, and made 19 appearances in the league going on to score 14 goals in the process, helping Lechia to win promotion to the V liga. He started his career as a forward before later transitioning into a midfield player for the majority of his career.

After his first season with Lechia, his career was notable for having a series of short spells with clubs, often only staying for six months with a club at a time. After his time with Lechia he joined II liga side Świt Nowy Dwór Mazowiecki, but failed to make an appearance during his six-month spell. His next move was with Hetman Zamość, also in the II liga, but at the lower end of the table, giving Paulewicz the chance to get playing time in the league for the club. Hetman were relegated at the end of the season, with Paulewicz remaining with the club for the first six months of the next campaign in the III liga. During the mid-season break he joined Siarka Tarnobrzeg, leaving at the end of the season moving to Drwęca Nowe Miasto Lubawskie. In 2005 Paulewicz was given the chance to play in Poland's top division, joining Lech Poznań. While the move to Lech was not a success, he made his I liga debut on 12 June 2005 in a 2–0 away win against Polonia Warsaw. It was Polonia Warsaw whom he joined next, adding a further 3 top flight appearances to his record, meaning he played in a total of 4 I liga appearances during his career.

He joined Cartusia Kartuzy for six months leaving at the end of the season. Paulewicz found himself without a club for the following season, and returned to playing football in 2007 with Kotwica Kołobrzeg. With Kotwica he won promotion in his first season, making a further 3 II liga appearances the following season. After his spell with Kotwica Paulewicz joined Czarni Pruszcz Gdański in what would be the longest spell of his career with one club, spending four and a half seasons with Czarni. In 2014 he joined GTS Pszczółki, retiring from football at the end of the season.

References 

1983 births
Living people
Sportspeople from Gdańsk
Polish footballers
Lechia Gdańsk players
Świt Nowy Dwór Mazowiecki players
Hetman Zamość players
Siarka Tarnobrzeg players
Lech Poznań players
Polonia Warsaw players
Cartusia Kartuzy players
Kotwica Kołobrzeg footballers
Association football midfielders